The Guild of Temporal Adventurers is an EP by Kendra Smith, released on 1992 through Fiasco.

Track listing

Personnel 
The Guild
Jonah Corey – vocals, Harmonium, organ, engineering, recording
Kendra Smith – vocals, bass guitar, guitar, production, engineering, recording
A. Phillip Uberman – Harmonium, organ, guitar, engineering, recording
Production and additional personnel
Mitch Greenhill – guitar on "She Brings the Rain"
Eergott Liqueure – guitar on "Stars Are in Your Eyes", "Waiting in the Rain"  and "She Brings the Rain"
Earl Martin – assistant engineering
Orson – drums on "Stars Are in Your Eyes" and "Waiting in the Rain"
Franz Pusch – mixing on "Waiting in the Rain"

References

External links 
 

1992 EPs